Barkocin  is a village in the administrative district of Gmina Kołczygłowy, within Bytów County, Pomeranian Voivodeship, in northern Poland. It is located within the historic region of Pomerania.

The village has a population of 70.

Notable residents
 Martin Kosleck (1904–1994), actor

References

Barkocin